The Torre Emperador Castellana, simply known as Torre Emperador and formerly named Torre Espacio (Spanish for Space Tower) is a skyscraper in Madrid, Spain, measuring 230 metres (755 feet) tall and containing 57 floors. It is currently the fourth tallest building in Madrid.

Construction
During its construction on the night of 4 September 2006, a fire broke out on the 43rd floor of the tower. The structure of the building suffered no critical damage, as the fire had only affected some construction materials.

The structure was topped out on 19 March 2007. That night, Madrid mayor Alberto Ruiz Gallardón attended a ceremony with fireworks to commemorate the event. With its 230 m, it also became the tallest structure in Spain at that time, surpassing the telecommunications tower Torrespaña. Torre de Cristal, one of the neighbouring skyscrapers at the Cuatro Torres Business Area, surpassed the height of Torre Espacio in April 2007.

The building project was featured on the Discovery Channel's Build It Bigger series due to the skyscraper's unique form and shape.

It was designed by American architect Henry N. Cobb, a partner in the firm Pei Cobb Freed, and built by OHL. In 2009, it became the new home of the British Embassy in Madrid.  In 2010, the Embassy of Canada too moved to Torre Espacio. The Australian and Dutch Embassy are also located in the building.

Since 2015, it has been owned by Grupo Emperador S.A.U, owned by Chinese-Filipino entrepreneur Andrew Tan. Six years after the acquisition by the Filipino-Spanish company, the skyscraper got its name changed to Torre Emperador (or Torre Emperador Castellana), named after the popular Filipino brand Emperador Brandy, as they announced in a Facebook post.

See also
Torre Cepsa
Torre Sacyr Vallehermoso
Torre de Cristal (Madrid)
Cuatro Torres Business Area
Embassy of the United Kingdom, Madrid

References

External links

Se retira la última dotación de bomberos tras quedar extinguido el fuego en la madrileña Torre Espacio
Torre Espacio's official website
Emporis.com

Office buildings completed in 2008
Skyscraper office buildings in Madrid
Buildings and structures in Fuencarral-El Pardo District, Madrid
Modernist architecture in Madrid
2008 establishments in Spain